Donovan W. Frank (born June 24, 1951) is a senior United States district judge of the United States District Court for the District of Minnesota.

Education and career

Frank was born in Rochester, Minnesota. He received a Bachelor of Arts degree from Luther College in 1973 and his Juris Doctor from Hamline University School of Law in 1977. Frank began his legal career as an assistant county attorney in St. Louis County, Minnesota. In 1985, he was appointed a state district court judge in Minnesota's Sixth Judicial District. Frank served as an assistant chief judge of that court from 1988 to 1991. He was Chief Judge from 1991 to 1996.

Federal judicial service

On May 21, 1998, President Bill Clinton nominated Frank to the seat on the United States District Court for the District of Minnesota vacated by David S. Doty. He was confirmed on October 21, 1998 and later received his commission on October 22, 1998. He assumed senior status on October 31, 2016.

Sources
 
 Serres, Chris, "Jan. 26: Maverick judge to decide fate of sex offenders program", Minneapolis Star-Tribune, September 3, 2014.

1951 births
Living people
Hamline University School of Law alumni
Judges of the United States District Court for the District of Minnesota
Luther College (Iowa) alumni
Minnesota state court judges
People from Rochester, Minnesota
United States district court judges appointed by Bill Clinton
20th-century American judges
21st-century American judges